"Just Want You to Know" is a song performed by American vocal group Backstreet Boys. The song was released on July 18, 2005, as the second single from the group's fifth studio album, Never Gone (2005). The single performed well in European countries, reaching the top 10 in the United Kingdom. Spain, and Belgium and peaking within the top 20 in Germany, Ireland, and Italy.

Music video
The video for the song is based on the 1986 documentary Heavy Metal Parking Lot, and features the Backstreet Boys as fans in 1985 of the fictional heavy metal band "Sphynkter". There were two videos for this song and both were directed by Marc Klasfeld and released worldwide on September 3, 2005.

Track listings

UK CD1 and European CD single
 "Just Want You to Know"
 "Larger than Life" (live)

UK CD2 and Australian CD single
 "Just Want You to Know"
 "I Want It That Way" (live)
 "Show Me the Meaning of Being Lonely" (live)

UK DVD single
 "Just Want You to Know" (video)
 "Weird World" (a performance taken from AOL Live)

European maxi-CD single
 "Just Want You to Know" – 3:51
 "Show Me the Meaning of Being Lonely" (live) – 4:44
 "Larger than Life" (live) – 3:57
 "I Want It That Way" (live) – 4:15
 "Just Want You to Know" (video enhancement)
 Screensaver enhancement

Japanese CD single
 "Just Want You to Know" (album version)
 "Just Want You to Know" (instrumental version)
 "I Want It That Way" (live)

Personnel
 Drums, Percussion – Shawn Pelton 
 Engineer [Additional Pro Tools] – John Hanes 
 Engineer [Assistant Additional Pro Tools] – Tim Roberts 
 Engineer [Pro Tools Techs] – Christian Nilsson, Dan Chase 
 Mixed By – Serban Ghenea 
 Producer – Max Martin and Lukasz "Dr. Luke" Gottwald
 Recorded By – Christian Nilsson, Lukasz "Dr. Luke" Gottwald, Seth Waldmann 
 Recorded By [Assistant] – Alan Mason 
 Recorded at Maratone Studios, Stockholm, Sweden & Conway Studios, Hollywood, CA
 Written By – Max Martin, Lukasz Gottwald
 A&R – Steve Lunt

Charts

Release history

References

2005 singles
2005 songs
Backstreet Boys songs
Jive Records singles
Music videos directed by Marc Klasfeld
Song recordings produced by Dr. Luke
Song recordings produced by Max Martin
Songs written by Dr. Luke
Songs written by Max Martin